Jbel Hamra is a mountain located in Oriental Region, Oujda, Morocco. The estimated terrain elevation above sea level is 781 m.

References 

Hamra